Leigh Farm is a historic home and plantation complex located near Chapel Hill, Durham County, North Carolina.  The house was built about 1834, and is a one-story, three bay, frame dwelling with a broad gable roof. Also on the property are the contributing frame gable-roof well, dairy, smokehouse, log slave quarters, a log dwelling, corn crib, frame carriage house, and log tobacco barn.

It was listed on the National Register of Historic Places in 1975.

References

Houses on the National Register of Historic Places in North Carolina
Farms on the National Register of Historic Places in North Carolina
Houses completed in 1834
Houses in Durham County, North Carolina
National Register of Historic Places in Durham County, North Carolina
Plantation houses in North Carolina
Slave cabins and quarters in the United States